Francis John Roy Grier (born 29 July 1955 in Kota Kinabalu, Malaysia) is an English choral and vocal classical composer and psychoanalyst.

He was a chorister at St George's Chapel, Windsor Castle, music scholar at Eton College, and organ scholar at King's College, Cambridge, then Assistant Organist and then Organist (1981-5) of Christ Church Cathedral, Oxford. He made many recordings and broadcasts as organist and choir director, including playing La Nativité du Seigneur by Olivier Messiaen at the first ever Prom concert given over to a solo performer.

As chamber music pianist he has been playing with the soprano Dorothee Jansen in the Jansen-Grier-Duo since their inaugural recital in summer 2000.

As a composer he has written much for the Anglican choral tradition and several large-scale works. He has also written many instrumental pieces.

His latest work, The Passion, for chorus, soloists and orchestra, received its premiere in March 2006 in Minneapolis by the VocalEssence Ensemble Singers, directed by Philip Brunelle.  The work received its UK premiere the following month in Cambridge by the BBC Singers.

He also accompanies his children, violinist Savitri Grier (16) and cellist Indira Grier (14).

Francis Grier is also a psychoanalyst who maintains a private practice and is a visiting researcher at the Tavistock Marital Studies Institute.

References

External links
Francis Grier (Choral Conductor, Organ)

1955 births
People from Kota Kinabalu
20th-century classical composers
21st-century classical composers
Alumni of King's College, Cambridge
British classical composers
British male classical composers
British psychoanalysts
Cathedral organists
English classical organists
British male organists
Living people
People educated at Eton College
People educated at St George's School, Windsor Castle
20th-century English composers
21st-century organists
20th-century British male musicians
21st-century British male musicians
Organ Scholars of King's College, Cambridge
Male classical organists